Florence Nightingale is a 1915 British silent historical film directed by Maurice Elvey and starring Elisabeth Risdon, Fred Groves and A. V. Bramble. The film portrays the life of Florence Nightingale, particularly her innovations in nursing during the Crimean War (1854–56). The film was based on Edward Tyas Cook's biography of Nightingale.

Cast
 Elisabeth Risdon as Florence Nightingale  
 Fred Groves as Doctor  
 A. V. Bramble as Sydney Herbert 
 M. Gray Murray   
 Beatrix Templeton  
 Pauline Peters

References

Bibliography
 Murphy, Robert. Directors in British and Irish Cinema: A Reference Companion. British Film Institute, 2006.

External links
 

1915 films
1910s biographical drama films
1910s historical drama films
British black-and-white films
British biographical drama films
British historical drama films
British silent feature films
1910s English-language films
Crimean War films
Films directed by Maurice Elvey
Films about Florence Nightingale
Cultural depictions of Florence Nightingale
Films set in the 1850s
Films set in England
1910s British films
Silent historical drama films